Marabunta is one of the names given to army ants.

Marabunta may also refer to any of the following:

Animals
Cheliomyrmex, an army ant
Marabunta (wasp), a colloquial name for large stinging wasps in South America

Films and TV
Marabunta (film), a 1998 horror movie
"Marabounta", an episode of Code Lyoko
Marabunta, the army ants in the 1954 movie The Naked Jungle

Other uses
Marabunta (software), an anonymous P2P application